Gugan Singh Ranga (born 7 September 1948) is a leader of Bharatiya Janata Party and a former member of the Delhi Legislative Assembly from Bawana.

He joined Aam aadmi party on 30 July 2017 in presence of Delhi chief minister Arvind kejriwal. Gugan Singh Ranga contested from the North West Delhi parliamentary constituency as an AAP party candidate for the 2019 Lok Sabha Elections, he lost the contest by a margin of around 5,53,897 from Hans Raj Hans.

He returned to BJP on 30 December 2019 in the presence of Union minister Prakash Javadekar and Delhi BJP chief Manoj Tiwari.

Political career

2019 Lok Sabha Election
Gugan Singh Ranga contested from the North West Delhi parliamentary constituency as an AAP party candidate for the 2019 Lok Sabha Elections he lost the contest by a margin of around 5,53,897 from Hans Raj Hans.

2013 Delhi Assembly elections

Gugan was elected from the reserved assembly constituency of Bawana on a BJP ticket in 2013, but was defeated by AAP's Ved Prakash in the 2015 polls.

References

2. https://www.firstpost.com/politics/gugan-singh-rejoins-bjp-ahead-of-delhi-assembly-polls-aaps-manish-sisodia-says-defection-is-poll-season-phenomenon-7842571.html

Delhi MLAs 2013–2015
1948 births
Living people
Place of birth missing (living people)
Bharatiya Janata Party politicians from Delhi
Aam Aadmi Party politicians from Delhi
Aam Aadmi Party candidates in the 2019 Indian general election